Gymnosomatini is a tribe of bristle flies in the family Tachinidae. There are more than 30 genera and 200 described species in Gymnosomatini.

Genera
These 35 genera belong to the tribe Gymnosomatini:

Acaulona Wulp, 1884
Atrichiopoda Townsend, 1931
Bibiomima Brauer & von Bergenstamm, 1889
Bogosia Rondani, 1873
Bogosiella Villeneuve, 1923
Brasilomyia Özdikmen, 2010
Cesaperua Koçak & Kemal, 2010
Cistogaster Latreille, 1829
Clytiomya Rondani, 1861
Compsoptesis Villeneuve, 1915
Cylindrophasia Townsend, 1916
Dallasimyia Blanchard, 1944
Ectophasia Townsend, 1912
Ectophasiopsis Townsend, 1915
Eliozeta Rondani, 1856
Euacaulona Townsend, 1908
Euclytia Townsend, 1908
Eutrichopoda Townsend, 1908
Eutrichopodopsis Blanchard, 1966
Gymnoclytia Brauer & von Bergenstamm, 1893
Gymnosoma Meigen, 1803
Homogenia Wulp, 1892
Itaxanthomelana Townsend, 1927
Melonorophasia Townsend, 1934
Pennapoda Townsend, 1897
Pentatomophaga Meijere, 1917
Perigymnosoma Villeneuve, 1929
Saralba Walker, 1865
Subclytia Pandellé, 1894
Syringosoma Townsend, 1917
Tapajosia Townsend, 1934
Trichopoda Berthold, 1827 (feather-legged flies)
Urucurymyia Townsend, 1934
Xanthomelanodes Townsend, 1892
Xanthomelonopsis Townsend, 1917

References

Tachinidae